Alexandros Lolis (born 5 September 2002) is a Greek professional footballer who plays as a midfielder for Super League club PAS Giannina.

Club career 
Lolis was part of  PAS Giannina youth system before he signed a professional contract in summer 2019. On 1 December 2019, Lolis made his professional debut for PAS Giannina against Platanias. On 27 September 2020, Lolis made his debut in Super League Greece, against Aris at the Kleanthis Vikelidis Stadium in a 2-2 draw.

International career 
Lolis represented Greece internationally at youth level, making his debut against Scotland.

Career statistics

Honours
PAS Giannina
 Super League Greece 2: 2019–20

References

2002 births
Living people
Greece under-21 international footballers
Greek footballers
Super League Greece players
Super League Greece 2 players
PAS Giannina F.C. players
Association football midfielders
People from Igoumenitsa
Footballers from Epirus (region)